Gavin Krenecki (born March 8, 2003) is an American professional soccer player who plays as a goalkeeper for Louisville Cardinals.

Club career

Youth
Born in Sacramento, California, Krenecki began his career at the Sacramento Republic youth academy before joining the Sporting Kansas City academy in 2019. He was signed to a short USL Academy contract with Sporting Kansas City's reserve side Swope Park Rangers in late 2019 but did not make an appearance.  Krenecki was then signed again to a USL Academy contract with the then rebranded Sporting Kansas City II in the USL Championship on August 13, 2020.

Krenecki made his professional debut for Sporting Kansas City II on August 15, 2020, against Saint Louis FC. He started in goal as Sporting Kansas City II were defeated 3–1.

College
In the fall of 2021, Krenecki began playing college soccer at the University of Louisville.

Career statistics

Club

References

External links
Profile at the Sporting Kansas City website

2003 births
Living people
People from Sacramento, California
American soccer players
Association football goalkeepers
Sporting Kansas City II players
USL Championship players
Soccer players from California
Louisville Cardinals men's soccer players